European Skeptics Congresses (ESCs) – a series of congresses now supported by the European Council of Skeptical Organisations (ECSO), in which skeptical organisations from many different European countries participate. They have been held ever since 1989. The conferences are often held in the month of September, and may last from two up to four days. The ECSO was formed at the 6th ESC on 25 September 1994 in Ostend, Belgium. Since its foundation, the ECSO co-ordinates in the organisation of new ESCs that take place (on average) every other year, and is hosted by a different member organisation each time. Skeptical organisations that are non-ECSO members may also send their delegations. Past ESCs are enumerated below.

ESC 1, Germany 1989 

Date: 5–7 May

Place: Bad Tölz

ESC 2, Belgium 1990 

Date: 10–11 August

Place: Brussels

ESC 3, Netherlands 1991 

Date: 4–5 October

Place: Amsterdam

ESC 4, Italy 1992 

Date: 17–19 July

Place: Saint-Vincent

ESC 5, United Kingdom 1993 

Date: 29–31 August

Place: Keele

Theme: "Science for Life: Health, Medicine and Well-Being". Organised by the UK Skeptics.

ESC 6, Belgium 1994 

Date: 23–25 September

Place: Ostend

Theme: "Science, Pseudoscience and the Environment".

During this congress the European Council of Skeptical Organisations was formed.

ESC 7, Germany 1995 

Date: 4–7 May

Place: Roßdorf

ESC 8, Spain 1997 

Date: 4–7 September

Place: A Coruña

ESC 9, Netherlands 1999 

Date: 17–19 September

Place: Maastricht

Hosted by Stichting Skepsis

ESC 10, Czech Republic 2001 

Date: 7–9 September

Place: Prague

Theme: "Rise and Development of Paranormal Beliefs in Eastern Europe"

ESC 11, United Kingdom 2003 

Date: 5–7 September

Place: London

ESC 12, Belgium 2005 

Date: 13–15 October

Place: Brussels

Theme: "Pseudoscience, Alternative Medicine and the Media"

ESC 13, Ireland 2007 

Date: 7–9 September

Place: Dublin

Theme: "The Assault on Science: Constructing a Response" 100+ attendees.

ESC 14, Hungary 2010 

Date: 17–19 September

Place: Budapest

ESC 15, Sweden 2013 

Date: 22–25 August

Place: Stockholm

Theme: "ESCape to Clarity!"

ESC 16, United Kingdom 2015 

Date: 10–13 September

Place: London

Organised by Association for Skeptical Enquiry and Anomalistic Psychology Research Unit

ESC 17, Poland 2017 

Date: 22–24 September

Place: Wrocław

Organised by Klub Sceptyków Polskich and Český klub skeptiků Sisyfos

The speakers:
 Deborah Hyde – The Restless Ghost of Wroclaw
 Diego Fontanive – Meta-Memetic Thinking and Skepticism as a Meme
 Eran Segev – The Secrets of an Effective Skeptical Organization
 Gerald Ostdiek – Believing in Biology: The Religious Imagination of Living Things (Including People)
 Holm Gero Hümmler – Relative Quantum Nonsense: Don't be Fooled by False Physics!
 Jakub Kroulik – Exorcism by Hypnosis
 James Randi
 Konrad Szołajski – The Battle with Satan in Poland
 Konrad Talmont-Kamiński – Cognition and the Science/Religion Debate
 Leo Igwe – "Robber Goat", "Bird Woman" and "Cat Woman": How Religion is Hampering Scientific Thinking in Africa
 Marcin Rotkiewicz – Rational Thinking vs. Moral Disgust: Why the Discussion about GMOs Is So Hard and the Scientific Evidence Is Unable to Convince the Public
 Mariusz Błochowiak – Rational justification for the existence of the devil and the exorcism
 Mark Lynas – Why anti-GMO activists are the new climate deniers
 Massimo Polidoro – An interview with James Randi
 Ovidiu Covaciu – How the Romanian anti-vaccine movement threatens Europe
 Petr Jan Vinš – A Priest's View
 Scott Lilienfeld – Tunnel Vision: Confirmation Bias from Courtroom to Boardroom to Bedroom
 Sofie Vanthournout – Talking about Evidence in the Post-Truth Era
 Susan Blackmore – Positive Scepticism: The new science of out-of-body experiences
 Susan Gerbic – We Marched for Science – Now What?
 Tomáš Moravec – How Rational are the Fears of GMOs?
 Zbynek Vybiral – Why Psychology Is Not Only in a Replication Crisis

There were also free workshops organised for the public.

ESC 18, Belgium 2019 

Date: 30 August – 1 September

Place: Ghent
 Norbert Aust – Informationsnetzwerk Homöopathie
 Mathijs Beckers – How skepticism helped me become pro-nuclear
 Johan Braeckman – Con men in the art world
 Vanessa Charland – Near-death experiences: actual considerations
 Ovidiu Covaciu – The antivaccination activists, misinformation and the damage done
 Edzard Ernst – The battle against SCAM. Are we winning?
 Farah Focqaert – How con men operate
 André Fougeroux – Is it still possible to rationally address modern agriculture?
 Lieven Gheysen (Aka. Gili)
 Michael Heap – Anomalistic Psychology in the Classroom
 Inge Jeandarme – Dealing with psychopathy
 Catherine de Jong – Chairperson for the session The never-ending struggle against quackery
 Michel Naud – Science and decision: towards restoring scientific integrity in policy making
 Jan Willem Nienhuys – Descent into one’s own illusion
 Geerdt Magiels – Chairperson for the session on Anomalistic Psychology
 Christine Mohr – When using magicians to study how paranormal beliefs come about
 Iida Ruishalme – Energy and decarbonisation
 Amardeo Sarma – Chairperson for the session on Green Skepticism
 Kavin Senapathy – GMOs, modern agriculture, and the People
 Lukas Stalpers – Vitamin B12 clinics: An example of a hype that results in clinics with quackery
 Tim Trachet – Chairperson for the session on 30 Years of European Skepticism
 Dirk Vogelaers – Lyme disease: An example of a real disease misused by quacks
 Wietse Wiels – Co-chairing the session The never-ending struggle against quackery
 David Zaruk – Reason has left the building: How the emotional need for certainty and safety has handcuffed research and technology
 Sophie van der Zee  – How con men operate in cyberspace

ESC 19, Austria 2022 
Date: 9–11 September

Place: Billrothhaus, Vienna

 Florian Aigner – Why we can trust in Science
 David Badcock – The future – Rational European drug policies
 Pontus Böckman – Chairperson for the session Skepticism in the Classroom
 Giulia Conforto – Making science-based decisions in politics (Panel)
 Katalin Cseh – Making science-based decisions in politics (Panel)
 Annika Harrison – The Skeptical Movement in Europe (Panel)
 Alice Howarth – The Skeptical Movement in Europe (Panel)
 Holm Hümmler – 5G mobile networks – the conspiracy myths and what they really do
 Catherine de Jong – Chairperson for the session Towards Rational European Drug Policies
 Gábor Kemenesi – The strange relationship of humanity and pandemics in the 21st century
 Claire Klingenberg – Chairperson for the session The Skeptical Movement in Europe (Panel)
 Johannes Kopton – “Natural” or sustainable? Agriculture Environmentalism at the Crossroads
 Péter Krekó – The structure of pseudo-scientific revolutions
 Stephen Law – How to raise moral citizens
 Philippe Longchamps – Teacher competence and the combat against misinformation
 Elisa Palazzi – Communicating uncertainty in the science of climate change
 Kellie C. Payne – Making science-based decisions in politics (Panel)
 Massimo Pigliucci – Skepticism as a way of life
 András Gábor Pintér – Chairperson for the session Making science-based decisions in politics (Panel)
 Massimo Polidoro – The Skeptical Movement in Europe (Panel)
 Claudia Preis – Chairperson for Keynotes Why we can trust in Science and Skepticism as a way of life
 Jan-Willem van Prooijen – Belief in conspiracy theories during a pandemic
 Franck Ramus – What is evidence-based education?
 Sergio Della Sala – The reliable uncertainty of science
 Amardeo Sarma – Chairperson for the session Conspiracy Theories
 Ulrike Schiesser – Building bridges – how to talk to conspiracy believers
 Anne Katrin Schlag – The truth about drugs: From misinformation to science
 Georg Steinhauser – The hazards of radiation

See also 
 List of skeptical conferences
 QED: Question, Explore, Discover
 The Amaz!ng Meeting (TAM!)
 CSICon

References

External links 

 

Scientific skepticism
Skeptic organizations
Articles containing video clips